Albert Austin (13 December 1882 – 17 August 1953) was an English actor, film star, director, and script writer, remembered for his work in Charlie Chaplin films.

Biography
Austin was born in Birmingham, Warwickshire, England, and was a music hall performer before going to the United States with Chaplin, both as members of the Fred Karno troupe in 1910.

Known for his painted handlebar moustache and acerbic manner, he worked for Chaplin's stock company and played supporting roles in many of his films, often as a foil to the star and working as his assistant director.

After the development of sound films, he moved into scriptwriting, directing, and acting, chiefly in comedy shorts. Among other things, he assisted Chaplin in developing the plot of The Adventurer (1917). However, he only received screen credit as a collaborator once, for City Lights (1931).

As an actor, he appeared in Chaplin's comedies for the Mutual Film Corporation. Later he had two brief, uncredited roles in one of Chaplin's 'silent' comedies made in the sound era, City Lights. Austin is also seen very briefly (as a cab driver) at the beginning of Chaplin's short film One A.M. (1916). He also appeared in films starring Jackie Coogan and Mack Sennett.

Austin's best known performance may be in Chaplin's short The Pawnshop (1916). Austin enters the shop with an alarm clock, hoping to pawn it. To establish the clock's value, Chaplin dissects it. Austin maintains a deadpan expression as Chaplin progressively destroys his clock, then hands the pieces back to Austin.

He had the leading role in Mary Pickford's Suds (1920), where he co-stars as a customer leaving his shirt at her laundry. In that film he appears without his comic moustache.

In his final years he worked as a police officer at the Warner Brothers studios, according to a New York Times obituary. He died on 17 August 1953, and was interred at Grand View Memorial Park Cemetery in Glendale, California.

Filmography

References

 The New York Times obituary, 19 August 1953 (accessed via http://select.nytimes.com, 10 November 2008)
 Charlie Chaplin's Collaborators, British Film Institute, accessed 10 November 2008

External links
 

1881 births
1953 deaths
English emigrants to the United States
English male film actors
English film directors
English male silent film actors
People from Birmingham, West Midlands
Male actors from Birmingham, West Midlands
20th-century English male actors
British expatriate male actors in the United States
Burials at Grand View Memorial Park Cemetery